Hajji Baba may refer to:
Books by James Justinian Morier
Hajji Baba-ye Olya, a village in West Azerbaijan Province, Iran
Hajji Baba-ye Sofla, a village in West Azerbaijan Province, Iran
Hajji Baba-ye Vosta, a village in West Azerbaijan Province, Iran